De Mist Commando was a light infantry regiment of the South African Army. It formed part of the South African Army Infantry Formation as well as the South African Territorial Reserve.

History

Origin

Town Guard
Commandos units in Uitenhage can be traced back to 1846 when a Town Guard was established.

Operations

With the SADF
The modern Uitenhage Commando was established at Uitenhage on 29 June 1973 and was later renamed to De Mist Commando on 7 November 1984. Uitenhage Commando is not to be confused with Uitenhage Regiment which was an industrial unit.

Reaction Force
In 1955, the unit became a fully counter insurgency battalion with reaction capability.

Under the SADF structure, this commando resorted under Group 6 as part of the Eastern Province Command.

With the SANDF

Disbandment
This unit, along with all other Commando units was disbanded after a decision by South African President Thabo Mbeki to disband all Commando Units. The Commando system was phased out between 2003 and 2008 "because of the role it played in the apartheid era", according to the Minister of Safety and Security Charles Nqakula.

Unit Insignia
The emblem of this commando was approved in 1973 and soon thereafter it received the freedom of the town of Despatch. The modified emblem was approved in 1986.

Leadership

References

See also 
 South African Commando System

Infantry regiments of South Africa
South African Commando Units